William Lloyd "Jerry" McCauley (c. 1871 – March 23, 1898) was an American football player and coach. He was the third head coach of the University of Michigan football team.

McCauley was born in approximately 1871 and listed his home town as Stanley, New York.  He attended preparatory school at Geneva Prep.  He later attended Princeton University, where he played for the Princeton Tigers football teams in 1892 and 1893 as a tackle, left end and halfback.  He was six feet tall and 175 pounds while playing football at Princeton.

McCauley later enrolled at the University of Michigan as a medical student.  While at Michigan, he served as the head coach of the 1894 and 1895 Michigan Wolverines football teams. He compiled a coaching record of 17–2–1, and his .875 winning percentage remains the second highest in the program's history.  McCauley was a medical student at Michigan while he served as the coach of the football team.  In his two seasons as head coach, the Wolverines lost only two games, once to Cornell and once to Harvard.  In 1894, the Wolverines defeated Cornell, 12–4, the first time that a "western school" had beaten one of the established eastern football powers.  He also served as an assistant coach for the 1896 Michigan football team.

After leaving Michigan, McCauely was a student in the medical department of the University of Pennsylvania.  In March 1898, he died of heart disease at his home in Rochester, New York.

Head coaching record

References

External links
 Profile at Bentley Historical Library, University of Michigan Athletics History

Year of birth uncertain
1898 deaths
19th-century players of American football
American football ends
American football halfbacks
American football tackles
Michigan Wolverines football coaches
Princeton Tigers football players
Sportspeople from Rochester, New York